Oscar Leung  (born 1979) is an actor previously contracted to TVB. His uncle is the actor Bryan Leung.

Filmography

TV dramas

Films

Micro Film

|-
! colspan="3" style="background: #DAA520;" | My AOD Favourite Awards
|-

|-
! colspan="3" style="background: #DAA520;" | TVB Anniversary Awards
|-

References

External links
 
 
 
 
 

1979 births
Living people
Hong Kong male film actors
Hong Kong male television actors
TVB veteran actors
21st-century Hong Kong male actors